The Battle of An Lão was a battle that took place in the An Lão District of Bình Định Province, just over 300 miles north-east of Saigon  between December 7–9, 1964. The battle was part of a larger 5th Military Region operation known as Campaign An Lão  to capture An Lão valley, and use it as a corridor between their military bases in Quảng Ngãi Province and Bình Định Province.

The Battle of An Lão was initiated by offensive actions conducted jointly by People's Army of Vietnam (PAVN) forces and Viet Cong (VC) guerrillas when they captured the An Lão district headquarters in the coastal Bình Định province within the II Corps tactical zone. For three days, this joint military force successfully repelled large numbers of counterattacking Army of the Republic of Vietnam (ARVN) troops. 

This battle was the first time in northern South Vietnam (South Central Coast of the united Vietnam) and the Central Highlands that the PAVN and VC "used the new tactic of coordinating main force units with local and guerrilla forces."

Background
In 1964, with successive defeats in all battlefields, the government of the South Vietnam tried to strengthen its forces by occupying key mountainous areas in order to control the bases of the Viet Cong. Implementing that policy, the South Vietnam built the An Lão district headquarter base.

As a mountainous district located in the north of Bình Định, the inhabitants are mainly H're people, during Anti-French Resistance War, An Lão was an important base of  the 5th Military Region. Although most of district area are mountains, the district capital lies in a valley, where important traffic hubs are located. Road 56 connects with Highway 1A in Bồng Sơn to the south. In the north of the district capital, Road 56 is divided into two branches, one parallel to the An Lão River running straight to Ba Tơ District, another branch crossing the river running along the valley is the arterial road of the An Lão district headquarters.

Prelude

The ARVN increased the number of troops stationed in the area up to 884, including two companies and two platoons of Regional Forces, 12 platoons of Popular Forces, one mortar platoon and one Special Forces platoon. In addition to the force in the district capital headquarters base, the ARVN also arranged three strongholds: 
Mount Một  (also known as Hill 193) located in the north of An Lão bridge, block the road between the district capital and the northwest area; Mount Mít (in Long Thạnh); and Bà Nhỏ stream (in Hội Long). Civilians in the valley were gathered into 8 strategic hamlets, each hamlet was guarded by a Popular Forces platoon .

In this continuous defense system, Mount Một is the main base. Here, the ARVN deployed a Regional Forces company, a mortar platoon, a Special Forces platoon and a Popular Forces platoon.

In early December 1964, the Party Committee and the Command of the 5th Military Region decided to attack the An Lão district capital to expand their controlled area. With the determination to destroy ARVN forces neatly, the PAVN gathered forces to overwhelm the enemy. Along with the Province Command's Local Forces includes a company of province, 8 platoons of districts and guerrilla forces of the communes, the Military Region 5 also reinforced the 2nd Infantry Regiment and the 409th Sapper Battalion of Main Forces.

Battle

On December 7, 1964, the Viet Cong captured the district headquarters following an early morning surprise attack with squads scaling the fence and lobbing grenades to disable the ARVN machine gun positions ringing the base. A second wave of attackers infiltrated the base and ultimately took control. That night MACV headquarters reported the VC had overrun the command post on Hill 193, were threatening An Lão’s subsector headquarters, and remained in the area to fight. Two ARVN companies were missing.

The VC were successful in repeatedly beating back large numbers of counterattacking ARVN troops, who rushed in by Jeep and M113 armored personnel carriers. 

ARVN troops regained control of the district headquarters only after reinforcements were airlifted in by U.S. helicopters. 

The battle resulted in approximately 300 ARVN dead and wounded, 3 American dead, and forced as many as 7,000 villagers to abandon their homes.

The strength of the VC attack in northern Bình Định Province indicated the changing tactics of the VC, who were prepared to switch from small-scale guerrilla actions to mobile warfare.

Legacy
Battle of An Lão map appears in Rising Storm 2: Vietnam - a video game released worldwide in 2017 by cooperation of Antimatter Games, Tripwire Interactive and Iceberg Interactive.

References

Battles and operations of the Vietnam War
Battles involving Vietnam
Battles involving the United States
1964 in Vietnam
Battles and operations of the Vietnam War in 1964
History of Bình Định province